Lionel Estève (born July 30, 1967) is a French artist sculptor recognized for his work grounded in geometric abstraction and kinetic art. His work deals with the boundaries of human perception and connection between man and nature. Since the late-1990s, his work has been exhibited widely, most notably at Musée d’Art Moderne de la Ville de Paris and MOMA Museum of Modern Art in New York. In 2020, Estève published his first autobiographical story entitled Mourir. Estève studied at École nationale supérieure des beaux-arts de Lyon and Philologie Romane at the Free University of Brussels. He lives and works in Brussels and Southeastern France.

Work

Estève is defines all his work as a sculpture. His work is both figurative and abstract and is generally inspired after motifs found in the natural environment or through the experience of vision and perception. His signature sculptures are playful and show clear affinities with kinetic art and the Zero movement. The elements of movement in the work of Estève unquestionably refers to the work of classics such as Jan Schoonhoven and Walter Leblanc in which the flat surface gives rise to visual illusions and transient effects. In his work, he often emphasizes space through, among other things, mobiles in colored plexiglass or fine mesh in steel wire. His light colorful structures often vibrate and are often sensual. He experiments with various materials and handcrafted techniques to create works that include different forms of art: collages, assemblage (art), sculptures, kinetic art sculptures, and mobile (sculpture).

Exhibitions

Solo exhibitions 
Estève has been the focus of several solo and retrospectives exhibitions at various international institutions, including Lionel Estève: Le ventre de la terre at the Musée du Verre in Charleroi (Marcinelle) in 2017;. Lionel Estève: Poussières urbaines et sculptures plates at Espace 251 Nord (La Comète) in Liege in 2016; Lionel Estève; Un nuage sur mes épaules at the Blueproject Foundation in Barcelona in 2015; Lionel Estève; Rétrospective at De La Charge in Brussels in 2015; Lionel Estève; Vivre en pensée at Les Eglises, centre d'art contemporain de la ville de Chelles in Chelles in 2015; Lionel Estève; Teenagers are Always Right at the Château de Vert Mont in Rueil-Malmaison in 2010; Lionel Estève: Lucky Colors at Louis Vuitton in Las Vegas in 2009; Lionel Estève: I can talk to my cat / Thinking what others are thinking at the Centre for Fine Arts, Brussels in 2008; Lionel Estève at the De Vereniging DD, Museum Dhondt-Dhaenens in Deurle in Belgium in 2008; Lionel Estève: Fleurs de Rocailles at the Herzliya Museum of Art in Herzliya (Israel) in 2006; Migrateurs: Lionel Estève, curated by Hans-Ulrich Obrist and directed by Suzanne Pagé et Laurence Bossé at the Musée d’Art Moderne de la Ville de Paris, Paris in 2003.

Group exhibitions 
Estève's work has been included in various group exhibitions in institutions and museums internationally. In 1998, he was invited to show at Centre Culturel de Belem in Lisbon in the exhibition O fascínio das faces da Flandres, 58/98: duas horas de viagem para duas de tamanho. The exhibition traveled to Koninklijk Museum voor Schone Kunsten in Antwerp and included work by, amongst others, Marcel Broodthaers, Jan Vercruysse, and Luc Tuymans. In 1999 he participated in Antwerp in the Laboratorium (art exhibition), curated by Hans-Ulrich Obrist and Barbara Vanderlinden, and in 1999 he participated in the survey exhibition Generation Z, curated by Klaus Biesenbach, Alanna Heiss, and Barbara Vanderlinden at the MoMA PS1 (formerly P.S.1 Contemporary Art Center) in New York. In 2000, Estève participated in La ville, le jardin, la mémoire, an exhibition curated by Laurence Bossé, Carolyn Christov-Bakargiev, and Hans-Ulrich Obrist at the Villa Medicis in Rome. In 2006–07 his work was presented in New York at the MOMA Museum of Modern Art in the survey exhibition An Eye on Europe, an exhibition curated by Deborah Wye. In 2015, Estève and the poet Sandra Lim considered 'life for Adam and Eve after the fall, as a banal reality that begins to crystallize.' The work and poem were published in T, The New York Times Style Magazine.

Collections 
Centre Georges Pompidou, Paris, France
CNAP Centre national des arts plastiques, National Centre for Visual Arts, Paris, France
Fonds régional d’art contemporain Bretagne, Rennes, France
Musée des Arts Décoratifs, Namur, Belgium
Macedonian Museum of Contemporary Art, Thessaloniki, Greece
Parlement de la federation Wallonie-Bruxelles, Brussels, Belgium
Thalielab, La Fondation Thalie, Brussels, Belgium
Fonds municipal d'art contemporain de la Ville de Paris, Paris, France
Museum of Modern Art, New York, US

Recognition 
In 2016, Estève received the SABAM Award for his distinguished contribution to the visual arts.

Personal life
Estève was born in Lyon on July 30, 1967. He studied visual art at École nationale supérieure des beaux-arts de Lyon and Roman Philologie at the Free University of Brussels. Since 1997, Estève has been living and working in Brussels and a small village in the Drôme, a department in Southeastern France where his grandfather was born.

See also

List of French artists

References 

Further reading (selected monographies and catalogues)

Writings by the artist
 

1967 births
French contemporary artists
21st-century French sculptors
21st-century French male artists
20th-century French sculptors
Sculptors from Lyon
Living people
French expatriates in Spain
French expatriates in Belgium
French expatriates in Germany